Atlantic Center for the Arts (ACA) is a nonprofit, interdisciplinary artists’ community and arts education facility  providing artists an opportunity to work and collaborate with contemporary artists in the fields of composing, visual, literary, and performing arts. Community interaction is coordinated through on-site and outreach presentations, workshops and exhibitions. The ACA is located in New Smyrna Beach, Florida. The complex was designed by the Boston-based firm Thompson and Rose Architects.

Atlantic Center has often been the starting point for new works which go on to be shown at national museums and performance centers such as the Metropolitan Opera, Lincoln Center for the Performing Arts, the Spoleto Festival, Jacob's Pillow, the Walker Art Center, the Brooklyn Academy of Music, the Museum of Modern Art, and Bang on a Can.

History 
Local artist and environmentalist Doris Leeper was instrumental in the founding of the ACA.

Leeper first conceived of the ACA in 1977 as a Florida artist-in-residence program in which artists of all disciplines could work with current prominent artists in a supportive and creative environment. Leeper saw the potential for an artist's residency as a place for ideas to be created, shared, and come into fruition. Leeper soon persuaded friends and community members to join in her vision. In 1979, she convinced the Rockefeller Foundation to provide a challenge grant that soon was matched. This $25,000 in seed money was the unofficial inception of the ACA.

When a prime piece of property became available on the shores of Turnbull Bay, a tidal estuary west of New Smyrna Beach, Leeper raised the $50,000 necessary to buy the ten-acre plot. Three years later, five main buildings were completed. Over the years, five more buildings were constructed and an additional 59 acres were purchased as preserve land.

In 1997, the Leeper Studio Complex, designed by Thompson and Rose Architects, was completed.

Facilities

Pabst Visitor Center & Gallery 
The Pabst Visitor Center is part of the ACA headquarters at 1414 Art Center Avenue, in New Smyrna Beach. The Visitor Center includes several public art galleries. The Jean G. Harris History Gallery features a permanent exhibit about the history and work of the Atlantic Center for the Arts. The Master Artist Gallery features changing exhibits by ACA Master Artists and other themed shows. The Jack Mitchell Portrait Gallery displays photographic portraits of ACA Master Artists from 1982 to 2004. The Visitor Center also features a gift shop, and a 500-foot public art and nature trail.

Leeper Studio Complex 
Comprising six buildings connected to existing structures by raised wooden walkways, the Leeper Studio Complex includes a library and studios for painting, sculpture, dance, music/recording, and theater. The studio complex added 12,000 sq. ft. of artists' working space to the existing campus and also provides additional facilities for public programs and partnerships.

Harris House Gallery 
The ACA also operates the Harris House Gallery at the Community Arts Center at Harris House, 214 South Riverside Drive, New Smyrna Beach, Florida

Programs

Master Artists-in-Residence Program 
The ACA Master Artists-in-Residence Program was designed to bring together internationally acclaimed master artists from different disciplines with talented artists who are selected by the masters. Since 1982, over 155 three-week-long interdisciplinary residencies have taken place at the Atlantic Center, featuring over 430 Master Artists and over 3,500 Associate Artists from around the world. (The first residency, in 1982, was with author James Dickey, sculptor Duane Hanson and composer David Del Tredici.) The pine and palmetto wooded environment includes a resource library, painting studio, sculpture studio, music studio, dance studio, black box theater, writer's studio, and digital computer lab.

Each residency session includes three master artists of different disciplines. The master artists each personally select a group of associates — talented, emerging artists — through an application process administered by ACA. During the residency, artists participate in informal sessions with their group, collaborate on projects, and work independently on their own projects. The relaxed atmosphere and unstructured program provide considerable time for artistic regeneration and creation. Atlantic Center for the Arts provides housing (private room/bath with work desk), weekday meals (provided by ACA chef), and 24-hour access to shared studio space. Other past master artists include Edward Albee, Allen Ginsberg, and John Ashbery.

Community Art Programs 
In 1991, Atlantic Center for the Arts at Harris House opened and the community arts program had its beginning. Located in the heart of a revitalized downtown, an historic home was converted to a cultural community center that since its inception has assumed a leadership role in providing arts education programs for children and cultural enrichment for adults. ACA at Harris House has exhibition space devoted solely to Florida artists.

Gallery

References

Notes

Sources consulted

External links

Artist colonies
Art museums and galleries in Florida
Arts centers in Florida
Tourist attractions in Volusia County, Florida
Buildings and structures in New Smyrna Beach, Florida